

 
Costello is a locality in the Northern Territory of Australia located in the territory's east adjoining the border with the state of Queensland  about  south-east of the territory capital of Darwin.

The locality consists of the following land (from north to south, then west to east):  
The Wakaya Aboriginal Lands Trust and land described as NT Portion 4246
The Arruwurra Aboriginal Corporation, NT Portions 4247, 581, 1094 and 1095, and the Argadargada pastoral lease and,
The Georgina Downs and Lake Nash pastoral leases
The locality fully surrounds the localities of Alpurrurulam and Canteen Creek.

The locality's boundaries and name were gazetted on 4 April 2007.  Its name is derived from the mountain range which was named in June 1989 as the Costello Range after John Costello, a pastoralist who established the Lake Nash Station in 1890 after moving his cattle from the Valley of the Springs Station which was located on the course of the Limmen Bight River.

Costello includes the following places listed on the Northern Territory Heritage Register – the Eldo Rocket Shelters Annitowa and the Eldo Rocket Shelters Argadargada.

The 2016 Australian census which was conducted in August 2016 reports that Costello had a population of 12 people.

Costello is located within the federal division of Lingiari, the territory electoral division of Barkly and the local government area of the Barkly Region.

References

Notes

Citations

Populated places in the Northern Territory
Barkly Region